The 1914 American Cup was the annual open cup held by the American Football Association. Forty-one teams entered the tournament. The Bethlehem Steel team debuted in and won the tournament playing ten games through six rounds.

American Cup Bracket

(a) first match protested
(b) match protested, Rovers refused replay
(c) aggregate after 3 games
(d) aggregate after 4 games

Final

Replay

See also
1914 National Challenge Cup

References

Amer
American Cup